Riley Carlisle Darnell (May 13, 1940 – October 2, 2020) was an American politician and lawyer who served in the Tennessee House of Representatives from the 67th district, Tennessee Senate from the 22nd district, Majority Leader of the Tennessee Senate, and as Tennessee Secretary of State as a member of the Democratic Party.

Darnell was born in Clarksville, Tennessee, and educated at Clarksville High School, Austin Peay State University, and Vanderbilt University Law School. In 1970, he was elected to the Tennessee House of Representatives with the Democratic nomination, and during his tenure in the House of Representatives, he served on the Judicial, Finance, and Fiscal Review committees. In 1980, he was elected to the Tennessee Senate, and during his tenure in the Senate, he served on the Transportation, Ethics, Finance Ways and Means, Fiscal Review, and the Children and Youth committees.

Darnell unsuccessfully sought the position of Speaker of the Senate against incumbent John Shelton Wilder in 1986. In 1989, he was selected to serve as Majority Leader of the Tennessee Senate. He lost re-election in 1992 but successfully defeated incumbent Secretary of State Bryant Millsaps and served in that position until 2009.

Early life

Riley Carlisle Darnell was born on May 13, 1940, in Clarksville, Tennessee, to Elliot S. Darnell and Mary Anita Whitefield. Riley graduated from Clarksville High School in 1958, graduated with a Bachelor of Science degree from Austin Peay State University in 1962, and graduated with a juris doctor degree from Vanderbilt University Law School in 1965.

He was accepted into the Tennessee State Bar in 1965. From 1966 to 1969, he served in the United States Air Force. He married Penny Corckarell, with whom he had five children.

Career

Tennessee House of Representatives
Riley announced in 1970 that he would seek the Democratic nomination for a seat in the Tennessee House of Representatives from the 67th district to succeed Frank J. Runyon. He won the Democratic nomination and faced no opposition in the general election. He was reelected in 1972, 1974, 1976, and 1978.

During the 1976 presidential election Riley supported and served as a delegate to the Democratic National Convention for Jimmy Carter from the 6th congressional district during the Democratic presidential primaries.

Riley was appointed to serve on the Judicial and Finance committees in the Tennessee House of Representatives in 1971. In 1975, Riley was selected over state Senator Doug Henry to succeed Representative John Hicks as chairman of the Fiscal Review committee.

Tennessee Senate

Riley announced in 1980 that he would seek the Democratic nomination for a seat in the Tennessee Senate from the 22nd district to succeed Halbert Harvill. He won the Democratic nomination against Perkins Freeman and Max Nichols and won in the general election against Republican nominee Alton Boyd. He was reelected in 1984, and 1988, but lost reelection to Carol Rice in 1992.

During the 1984 presidential election Riley supported and served on Walter Mondale's Tennessee steering committee during the Democratic presidential primaries.

Riley was appointed to serve on the Finance Ways and Means committee, as vice-chairman of the Transportation committee, and as chairman of the Ethics committee in the Tennessee Senate in 1981. In 1983, he was appointed to serve as a member of the Finance Ways and Means committee, vice-chairman of the Fiscal Review committee, and as chairman of the Transportation committee. He was selected to serve as chairman of the Select Committee on Children and Youth in 1987. From 1989 to 1992, he served as the Majority Leader of the Tennessee Senate.

On November 9, 1986, fifteen of the twenty-three Democrats in the Tennessee Senate voted to support Riley for the position of Speaker of the Senate, which informally served as the Lieutenant Governor of Tennessee, against incumbent John Shelton Wilder. However, Wilder defeated Riley with eighteen votes, with his support coming from eight Democrats and ten Republicans, against Riley's fifteen votes. Wilder later appointed Joe Nip McKnight to replace Darnell as chairman of the Transportation committee.

Tennessee Secretary of State

On November 9, 1992, Darnell announced that he would seek the office of Tennessee Secretary of State against incumbent Bryant Millsaps after he had lost reelection to the Tennessee Senate. Darnell won the Democratic nomination against Millsaps on November 19, and was elected as Secretary of State on Tennessee General Assembly on January 13, 1993. Darnell was reelected in 1997, 2001, and 2005. He lost reelected to Republican nominee Tre Hargett in 2009.

Death

Riley died from cancer in Clarksville, Tennessee, on October 2, 2020, and was buried in Greenwood Cemetery.

Electoral history

References

1940 births
2020 deaths
People from Clarksville, Tennessee
Military personnel from Tennessee
Austin Peay State University alumni
Vanderbilt University Law School alumni
Tennessee lawyers
Democratic Party members of the Tennessee House of Representatives
Democratic Party Tennessee state senators
Secretaries of State of Tennessee